A constitutional referendum was held in Togo on 9 April 1961 alongside the general elections. The changes to the constitution would make the country a presidential republic with a directly elected President. It was approved by 99.62% of voters with a 90% turnout.

Results

References

1961 referendums
1961 in Togo
1961
Constitutional referendums
April 1961 events in Africa